Trypocalliphora is a genus of flies belonging to the family Calliphoridae.

The species of this genus are found in Europe and Northern America.

Species:
 Trypocalliphora braueri (Hendel, 1901)

References

Calliphoridae